Luleseged Wale (born 29 May 1982) is an Ethiopian middle-distance runner. He competed in the men's 3000 metres steeplechase at the 2004 Summer Olympics.

References

1982 births
Living people
Athletes (track and field) at the 2004 Summer Olympics
Ethiopian male middle-distance runners
Ethiopian male steeplechase runners
Olympic athletes of Ethiopia
Place of birth missing (living people)